Ian Stuart Thomas (born 2 April 1950) is a former Australian cricket umpire. He stood in eight ODI games between 1990 and 1994.

See also
 List of One Day International cricket umpires

References

1950 births
Living people
Australian One Day International cricket umpires
Sportspeople from Sydney